Guillermo Enrique Billinghurst Angulo (ie. William Henry Billinghurst) (Arica, July 27, 1851 – Iquique, June 28, 1915) was a Peruvian politician of English descent who served as the 37th President of Peru. He succeeded Augusto B. Leguía, from 1912 to 1914. An Anglo-Peruvian Billinghurst's surname is a locational name 'of Billinghurst' a parish in Sussex, England.

During his presidency, Billinghurst became embroiled in an increasingly bitter series of conflicts with Congress, a liberal, he proposed and attempted to pass an advanced social legislation in favour of the working-classes. This was blocked by the conservative and oligarchic factions in the Peruvian Congress, whereupon Billinghurst attempted to call fresh elections. Whereupon these same Conservative factions now called upon the Peruvian military led by Óscar R. Benavides, to carry out a coup. As a result of the coup, which resulted in Benavides becoming President, Billinghurst was sent into exile in Chile where he died shortly thereafter.

Member of the Civilista Party
Born to wealthy, upper class English parents and raised in comfortable circumstances, Billinghurst belonged to the Civilistas group, which were then considered the architects of unprecedented political stability and economic growth in the country, but they also set in motion profound social changes that would, in time, alter the political panorama of Peru.

During his presidency, Billinghurst became embroiled in an increasingly bitter series of conflicts with Congress, ranging from proposed advanced social legislation to settlement of the Tacna-Arica dispute.

This provoked a military uprising organized by civilian opponents to his regime who used the military to carry out a coup. As a result of the uprising, Billinghurst was sent into exile in Chile where he died shortly thereafter.

As First Vice President of Peru under the Piérola Administration (1895–1899), Billinghurst was involved in several attempts to solve the Tacna and Arica territorial dispute with Chile. On April 9, 1898, a memorandum was subscribed between the Chilean Minister of Foreign Affairs Raimundo Silva Cruz and Billinghurst. It established that before a plebiscite could be held between both countries, an arbitrage would first be requested to the Queen of Spain, María Cristina de Habsburgo-Lorena (1858–1929) to determine the conditions of the vote.

Subsequent events led the Protocol of Billinghurst-Latorre not to be ratified by the Chilean Chamber of Deputies. A direct result of this setback was the break of diplomatic relations between Peru and Chile in 1901.

Billinghurst served as the President of the Senate from 1896 to 1897.

1912 elections
The elections of 1912 were the most passionate ones of the so-called Aristocratic Republic (a term coined by Peruvians referring to those in power that were mostly from the social elite of the country). The Civilist Party rallied behind the candidacy of Antero Aspíllaga, one of the most prominent and conservative members of the Party. His opponents accused him of being a Chilean-born Peruvian unfit for office.

The Civilistas, however, were unable to manage the new social forces that their policies unleashed. This first became apparent in 1912 when the millionaire businessman Guillermo Billinghurst-–the reform-minded, populist former mayor of Lima-–was able to organize a general strike to block the election of the official Civilista presidential candidate and force his own election by Congress.

Presidency
One of the main accomplishments of the Billinghurst administration was the establishment of important legislation that guaranteed the Eight-hour day in Peru.

When Congress opened impeachment hearings against Billinghurst in 1914, he threatened to arm the workers and forcibly dissolve Congress.

Guillermo Billinghurst was overthrown on February 4, 1914, in a military coup headed by colonel Oscar R. Benavides, Javier and Manuel Prado, and conservatives members of the Civilista Party. Later in exile, Billingshurst claimed the following:
"The young Prado, in an extense and pathetic speech, gave me the details and motives behind the coup: All of them (the mutineerered) recognised my patriotism, integrity and my capability to handle the government. However, the only and most serious mistake that I made was the course that my internal politics was doing to the country and, finally, I think the sons of former president Prado must «clean his fathers memory»"

See also
 List of presidents of Peru
 Politics of Peru

References

External links
 

1851 births
1915 deaths
People from Arica Province
Peruvian people of German descent
Peruvian people of English descent
Mayors of Lima
Presidents of Peru
Vice presidents of Peru
Presidents of the Senate of Peru
Democratic Party (Peru) politicians
Leaders ousted by a coup